The Enrico Fermi Nuclear Generating Station is a nuclear power plant on the shore of Lake Erie near Monroe, in Frenchtown Charter Township, Michigan on approximately . All units of the plant are operated by the DTE Energy Electric Company and owned (100 percent) by parent company DTE Energy. It is approximately halfway between Detroit, Michigan, and Toledo, Ohio. It is also visible from parts of Amherstburg and Colchester, Ontario as well as on the shore of Lake Erie in Ottawa County, Ohio. Two units have been constructed on this site. The first unit's construction started on August 4, 1956 and reached initial criticality on August 23, 1963, and the second unit received its construction permit on September 26, 1972.  It reached criticality (head on) on June 21, 1985 and was declared commercial on November 18, 1988. The plant is connected to two single-circuit 345 kV Transmission Lines and three 120 kV lines. They are operated and maintained by ITC Transmission.

The plant is named after the Italian nuclear physicist Enrico Fermi, most noted for his work on the development of the first nuclear reactor as well as many other major contributions to nuclear physics. Fermi won the 1938 Nobel Prize in Physics for his work on induced radioactivity.

On October 5, 1966, Fermi 1, a prototype fast breeder reactor, suffered a partial fuel meltdown, although no radioactive material was released.  After repairs it was shut down by 1972.

On August 8, 2008, John McCain was taken on a 45-minute tour of the plant, becoming the first actively campaigning presidential candidate to visit a nuclear plant.

Fermi 1

The 69 MWe prototype fast breeder reactor Fermi 1 unit was under construction and development at the site from 1956 to 1963. Initial criticality was achieved on August 23, 1963. On October 5, 1966 Fermi 1 suffered a partial fuel meltdown. Two of the 92 fuel assemblies were partially damaged.  According to the Nuclear Regulatory Commission (NRC), there was no abnormal radioactivity released into the environment.

Fermi 1 was a liquid metal (sodium) cooled fast breeder reactor design. It was capable of producing 200 megawatts thermal (MWt) power or 69 MW electrical power with 26% enriched metallic uranium fuel. The enriched uranium section of the reactor (core) was a 30 inch in diameter cylinder by 30 inches high and contained 92 fuel assemblies. The core was surrounded by 548 additional assemblies containing depleted uranium. These assemblies were about 2.5 inches square by about 8 feet tall. Only the core section contained the enriched uranium while depleted uranium was placed above and below within the assemblies. The core also contained 2 control rods and 8 safety rods. The plant was designed for 430 MWt and 125 MWe using a newer uranium oxide fuel, but the plant was closed before the fuel was ever ordered.

A 168 MWe oil-fired boiler was added in 1966 to utilize the turbine-generator during periods when the reactor was not producing power.

The main cause of the partial meltdown was a temperature increase caused by a blockage in one of the lower support plate orifices that allowed the flow of liquid sodium into the reactor. The blockage caused an insufficient amount of coolant to enter the fuel assembly; this was not noticed by the operators until the core temperature alarms sounded.

Following an extended shutdown that involved fuel replacement, repairs to vessel, and cleanup, Fermi 1 restarted in July 1970 and reached full power. Due to lack of funds and aging equipment, it was finally shut down permanently on November 27, 1972, and was officially decommissioned December 31, 1975, under the definition of the Atomic Energy Commission (AEC). Later, the Nuclear Regulatory Commission (NRC) replaced the AEC and under their new definitions, Fermi was re-designated as being in SAFSTOR due to some remaining radioactivity at the site.  On May 16, 1996, decommissioning was restarted. However, by November 2011 with very little activity remaining, a decision was made to halt further work. It is currently in SAFSTOR.

Fermi 2
Fermi 2 is a 1,202 MWe General Electric boiling water reactor owned and operated by DTE Energy. Plans to build were announced in July 1968. Initial criticality was achieved in July 1985, and full commercial operation commenced on January 23, 1988.

The reactor vessel holds 764 fuel assemblies and 185 control rods which modulate the power. The original turbine generator was an English Electric unit. After a turbine blade incident in 1993, the company replaced the turbine with a General Electric unit. Water flowing through the reactor vessel changes to saturated steam and then travels to the main turbine-generator to produce electricity. After that, the steam drops into a main condenser where it is condensed to liquid water and is recycled. A secondary loop of water which enters the tube side of the condenser is non-radioactive. This is a closed loop with only a small amount of make-up water needed from Lake Erie to replace any evaporation.

Two 345 kV lines send power to the customers. Those same lines are used to supply electricity to the site's safety equipment. Three additional 120 kV lines are also available to supply any needed back-up power to safety equipment. Additionally, four diesel generators and four combustion turbine generators are on site to power plant safety equipment during an emergency.

Fermi 3
The original Fermi 3 project was to be a companion unit identical to Fermi 2. It was ordered in 1972 and cancelled in 1974.  See DOE data  page 67 and WNA Fermi 3 data.

In September 2008, Detroit Edison filed an application with the Nuclear Regulatory Commission (NRC) for a Combined Construction and Operating License (COL) for a third reactor. The new unit is supposed to be built on the same site, slightly to the southwest of Fermi 2. The reactor design selected is the 1,550 MWe GE-designed passive Economic Simplified Boiling Water Reactor (ESBWR).  Review of the 17,000-page application could take four years, after which construction could take six years. The cost is estimated at as much as $10 billion.  CEO Anthony Earley said that DTE's analysis "so far shows that nuclear power will, over the long term, be the most cost-effective baseload option for our customers, ... We expect nuclear to remain the low-cost option, but we will continue to evaluate nuclear against other resources and will commit to proceeding with construction only at the right time and at the right cost".

In March 2009, a coalition of citizen groups asked federal regulators to reject plans for Fermi 3, contending that it would pose a range of threats to public health and the environment. The groups have filed 14 contentions with the NRC, claiming that a new plant would pose "radioactive, toxic and thermal impacts on Lake Erie's vulnerable western basin."

In May 2015, the NRC approved a combined construction and operating license for Fermi 3, but DTE Energy stated there were no plans for construction at that time.

Electricity Production 
Enrico Fermi generated 9,369 GWh in 2021.

Surrounding population

The 2010 U.S. population within  of Enrico Fermi was 4,799,526, a decrease of 3.4 percent in a decade, according to an analysis of U.S. Census data for msnbc.com. Cities within  include Detroit ( to city center) and Toledo. Additional population within  is in Canada, including Windsor, Ontario, .

A 2021 report by the Radiation and Public Health Project (RPHP) found a rise in the rate of death due to cancer with a steadily rising rate in Monroe County during the 2009-2018 decade and attempted to correlate it to Fermi. However numerous studies conducted by respected scientific organizations, such as the American Cancer Society and the National Cancer Institute, have shown that living near nuclear power plants "have no adverse impact on cancer rates" and the NRC has stated that numerous peer-reviewed scientific studies have shown no correlation, and that the RPHP's simple observation of a statistical association does not prove causation.  In an op-ed Pete Dietrich, Senior Vice President and Chief Nuclear Officer at DTE Energy called the report a "dishonest attempt to sway public opinion" and went on to point out that "At all U.S. nuclear plants, including Fermi, radiation is strictly monitored by radiation experts and the NRC."

Seismic risk
The Nuclear Regulatory Commission's 2010 estimate of the risk each year of an earthquake intense enough to cause core damage to the reactor at Fermi was 1 in 238,095 making it the 88th least likely to be damaged of all US nuclear generating stations.

Reactor data
The Enrico Fermi Nuclear Generating Station consists of one operational reactor, one closed unit and one additional is planned.

Notes

References
We Almost Lost Detroit, John G. Fuller, Ballantine Books, 1976
Normal Accident, Charles Perrow, Basic Books, 1984
We Did Not Almost Lose Detroit, Earl M. Page, Published by Detroit Edison Co., 3rd Edition in May 1976
 Some notes written by hands on principal engineer who worked at the site from 1967 to 2006.
Enrico Fermi Atomic Power Plant Hazards Summary Report
Enrico Fermi Atomic Power Plant 236 page booklet published by the Atomic Power Development Associates, Inc. (now defunct) in January 1959

External links

 Public Comments "Public Comments at the meeting re: FERMI 3 with the NRC. This includes youtube videos of speakers calling for an end to the new nuclear reactor project. Featured are a Professor from the U of M, Don't Waste Michigan members, Sierra Club members, and other concerned citizens."

Energy infrastructure completed in 1957
Energy infrastructure completed in 1988
Civilian nuclear power accidents
DTE Energy
Nuclear power stations using Economic Simplified Boiling Water Reactors
Buildings and structures in Monroe County, Michigan
Nuclear power plants in Michigan
Towers in Michigan
Nuclear power stations with proposed reactors
Nuclear accidents and incidents in the United States
1956 establishments in Michigan